Big Y Foods, Inc. (or Big Y) is an American, family-owned supermarket chain located in Massachusetts and Connecticut. It operates under the trade names "Big Y World Class Market" or "Big Y Supermarket".

In 1936, a young entrepreneur, Paul D'Amour, aided by his brother, Gerald, and sisters, Ann Marie, Yvette, and Gertrude, purchased the Y Cash Market in the Willimansett section of Chicopee, Massachusetts, at the "Y" intersection of Chicopee and Meadow Streets. On December 12, 1936, the brothers began Y Cash Market, the forerunner of Big Y. The company is headquartered in Springfield, Massachusetts. Big Y now is run by cousins Charles and Michael D'Amour.

Big Y is one of the largest independently owned supermarket chains in New England, and it employs over 12,000 people. In 2021 Big Y was the 210th-largest private company in the United States, according to that year's Forbes magazine "Largest Private Companies" list. Big Y is the fifth largest supermarket chain in New England after Quincy-based Stop & Shop, Scarborough-based Hannaford, West Bridgewater–based Shaw's Supermarkets, and Tewksbury-based Market Basket. Big Y is the second largest in Southern New England after the aforementioned Stop & Shop.

History
Big Y's largest competitor throughout its trade area is Stop & Shop, based out of Quincy, and to a lesser extent Big Y also competes with Boston-based Shaw's and Schenectady, New York's Price Chopper supermarkets.  In Connecticut, Big Y is now the second-largest supermarket chain by number of locations, with only Stop & Shop operating more Connecticut stores.

In July 2016, it was announced that Big Y had entered into a purchase agreement with Ahold and Delhaize Group for eight Hannaford Brothers locations in Massachusetts as part of the divestiture of stores to gain clearance from the Federal Trade Commission for the impending Ahold/Delhaize merger. The new stores, all converted from Hannaford, are located in Kingston, Quincy, Norwell, Milford, Norwood, West Peabody, Saugus, and Easton.  The addition of the eight new stores brought Big Y's store count in Massachusetts to 37, and increased its footprint in the state to extend from the Berkshires all the way to Greater Boston.

As of December 2021, Big Y operates 72 supermarkets in Massachusetts and Connecticut; many of which are located in the metropolitan areas of Springfield, Worcester, Greater Boston, and Hartford.  In addition to its traditional supermarkets, Big Y owns and operates two specialty markets: Table & Vine, a large specialty liquor and wine store in West Springfield; and the Fresh Acres Market, a concept mixing an open-air-style farmers' market with upscale food choices, in Springfield.  Big Y also operated two standalone pharmacies in Springfield and Wilbraham before eventually folding them into the pharmacies located in its nearby stores.  Between 2013 and 2021, Big Y opened 12 gas stations and convenience stores in Western Massachusetts and Connecticut, under the name "Big Y Express." Most Big Y Express stores are located adjacent to, or nearby, a full-size Big Y supermarket.

Locations and expansion

Big Y focuses primarily on opening stores to strengthen its existing footprint, though that footprint is expanding slowly.  Most Big Y stores are within a  radius of their Springfield headquarters.  In 2010, Big Y announced that its new store plans included Lee, Franklin, and Milford, Massachusetts; according to its website, each town would have a store by 2012.  The Lee store opened in November 2011, adding to Big Y's presence in the Berkshires; while the Franklin store opened in August 2012.  The Franklin store is a sister location to Big Y's store in Walpole; those two had been Big Y's only stores in Greater Boston until 2016.  Big Y also announced new stores in Foxborough and Holyoke, but plans for those locations were ultimately withdrawn.  The original Milford plans also never came to fruition, but after the previously mentioned buyout of eight Hannaford stores, Big Y now operates the former Hannaford stores in Milford, Norwell, Kingston, Easton, and Norwood.

In 2016, Big Y opened a Connecticut store in Shelton, bringing their store count in that state to 33. Big Y has also occasionally grown through acquisitions.  In addition to the previously mentioned acquisition of eight former Hannaford stores, in late 2010 Big Y purchased seven stores from A&P, which was leaving central Connecticut.  Four of these stores (Branford, Mystic, Old Lyme, and West Hartford) were renovated and re-opened as Big Y World Class Markets within a short period of time.

As of June 2017, the company operated 77 locations.

On November 7, 2019, Big Y opened two new store locations in Milford, Connecticut and Derby, Connecticut.

On March 7, 2022, Big Y announced plans to open locations in Uxbridge and Pembroke.

See also

References

External links
 Official website

1936 establishments in Massachusetts
American companies established in 1936
Companies based in Springfield, Massachusetts
Economy of the Northeastern United States
New England
Privately held companies based in Massachusetts
Retail companies established in 1936
Supermarkets of the United States
Family-owned companies of the United States